Betla National Park is a national park located on the Chota Nagpur Plateau in the Latehar and Palamu district of Jharkhand, India. The park hosts a wide variety of wildlife.

History
Betla was one of the first national parks in India to become a tiger reserve under Project Tiger, in 1974. The park is under administration of the Forest Department.

Flora
The forests of the park have a vast range of vegetation consisting of sal and bamboo as the major components along with a number of medicinal plants. The North Koel River and its tributaries flow through the northern portion of the park, producing grasslands.

Fauna

The park has a variety of diverse eco-systems and abundance of wild animals. Elephants in large numbers are seen mostly between the end of the monsoon season, to the time when water holes begin to dry in March.

Predators include the sloth bear and panther, while scavengers include the wolf, jackal and hyena. Other animals include large herds of gaur and chital, large families of langurs, rhesus monkeys, Indian giant squirrels, mouse deer, sambhar deer, four-horned antelopes, nilgai, kakar, small Indian civets, ant eating pangolin, porcupine and mongoose. White tigers that remained in the park were transported to zoos.

Birds include the hornbill, peafowl, red jungle fowl, black partridge, white-necked stork, black ibis, swamp grey, quail, pied hornbill, wagtail, harial, dove, drongo, crested serpent-eagle, forest owlet, papeeha, and other birds usually found in dry deciduous forests. The Kamaldah lake attracts several varieties of water birds including the common whistling, cotton teal, knob-billed duck, snipe and geese.

Other points of interest
The park features waterfalls and hot springs. It is now deep inside the forest, but the main sentinel of the old fort is visible high on the hill with defences in three directions and three main gates.

Tourism
The park provides several opportunities to observe a variety of wildlife at close range. There are elephant rides and jeeps available with guides for venturing inside the park. Watch towers and ground hides have been constructed to view the wildlife.

The park is open throughout the year. Wildlife sightings are highest in the hot season (May to June), when foliage is not as thick. The most comfortable time to visit in terms of climate is between November and March.

Access
Betla village (at ) is the only entry point to the park.

Accommodation
The accommodation facilities in the tourist complex include a three star hotel, tourist lodges with canteen, log huts and tree houses inside the forest with fully furnished suites. The tree house overlooks a watering hole a few yards away where the animals gather in the summers to quench their thirst. There is grassland near tree house and canteen, where herds of Spotted Deer come to graze. Subscriber trunk dialling/International direct dialing, postal and internet facilities are available in the reserve area. For local tourists, Core Area Division runs a tourist bus on Saturday and Sunday. Jharkhand Tourism Development Corporation operates the Van Vihar for accommodation. A stay outside the park is possible at Betla, Garu, Maromar and Baresanr.

References

National parks in Jharkhand
Latehar district
Chota Nagpur dry deciduous forests
Protected areas with year of establishment missing